John Spenser was an English academic.

John Spenser may also refer to:

John Spenser (Jesuit)
John Spenser (MP) for Newcastle-under-Lyme (UK Parliament constituency)

See also
John Spencer (disambiguation)